The Adventures of Super Diaper Baby is an American children's novel by Dav Pilkey (credited as "George Beard and Harold Hutchins"), categorized as part of the author's Captain Underpants series of books as a spin-off to the series. It was published on February 5, 2002.

Plot

Introduction
Fourth graders George Beard and Harold Hutchins skate over ketchup packets in the school gym until their rude-spirited principal, Mr. Krupp, forces them to clean up the mess and meet him at his office. Since writing a sentence over and over wouldn't teach the boys anything, Mr. Krupp assigns them to write a 100-page essay on good citizenship, which they can't turn into a Captain Underpants story. The boys promptly make a story with a new superhero called "Super Diaper Baby", which angers Krupp to the point of making them write sentences.

Main plot
Expectant couple Bill and Mary Hoskins rush to the hospital while Deputy Dangerous and his talking pet dog Danger Dog drain Captain Underpants of his superpowers with Deputy's fitted ray, which then converts it to a liquid the two would consume, but Danger only drinks half of it when the police arrives, whom they both evade. Back at the hospital, Mary gives birth to a boy named Billy, whom the attending doctor accidentally throws into the power container. Billy drinks the juice, gaining the super powers and he overpowers both Deputy Dangerous and Danger Dog, both of whom are then apprehended by the police. Billy then flies back to the maternity ward.

Danger Dog and Deputy Dangerous escape prison to their secret lab, where the latter invents a crib device connected by satellite that they deliver to the Hoskins under euphemistic pseudonyms, "Deputy Un-Dangerous" and "Safety Dog". Billy poops before midnight, and Mary gives him a very nice bath just as the "Heat-Seeking Dish" turns on. The device transits the poop, turning Deputy Dangerous into a small piece of turd. The next morning, Deputy Dangerous invents the "Robo-Ant 2000" so he can take over the world, but Danger Dog coins the name "Deputy Doo-Doo", then changes signs around. Billy fights the robot, but is taken by Deputy Doo-Doo to a nuclear power plant. Danger Dog saves Billy, while the Ant falls into the power plant instead. Bill and Mary want to keep "Safety Dog", but the Landlord worries that Danger Dog might stain the carpet, but changes his mind when they put a diaper on him and rename him Diaper Dog.

Meanwhile, back at the power plant, radioactivity causes Deputy Doo-Doo to grow into a giant and he resumes rampaging through the city. Diaper Baby and Diaper Dog fly out to stop him, but since Deputy Doo-Doo's now radioactive, they can't touch him. They instead trick him into attacking himself and wrap him up in a giant toilet roll, sending him to Uranus. On the way back to Earth, at a "Starbutts" on Mars, they decide to take some Super Power Juice back to Earth and go to the laundromat where Captain Underpants is held captive. They restore his powers, and the world is a better place.

Characters
Billy Hoskins/Super Diaper Baby – the book's protagonist; he is a newborn baby who gains Captain Underpants' powers.
Danger/Diaper Dog – the Hoskins' pet puggle and Super Diaper Baby's sidekick. He was once allied with Deputy Dangerous, but only because the villain gave him ample "kibbles". He gained superpowers by drinking half of the liquid produced by Deputy Dangerous' power-draining ray.
Deputy Dangerous/Doo-Doo – the main antagonist of Book 1. He becomes a piece of poop due to a mishap in one of his attempts to steal Super Diaper Baby's powers and grows huge when he gets dumped in radioactive waste. Billy and Diaper Dog wrap him with a giant toilet paper from Bob's Toilet Paper Store and take him to Uranus, never to be heard from again.
Dr. Dilbert Dinkle/Rip Van Tinkle – the main antagonist of Super Diaper Baby 2. He once was a criminal/inventor, now shunned everywhere due to his stench, as simple water-turned-urine. Dav Pilkey originally planned to name Tinkle "Pee Pee Longstockings". While attacking a giant pee-formed Dr. Dinkle, Billy and Diaper Dog push the Earth far away from the sun, making it snow and Dr. Dinkle freezes solid.
Petey – a grumpy tabby cat. Petey dislikes Rip Van Tinkle's attitude and bad breath. He is the controller of the Robo Kitty and Supa - Mecha Kitty 3000. He appeared in Book 2, as well as the Dog Man novels.

Additional characters
Bill and Mary Hoskins - Billy's parents.
Captain Underpants - George and Harold's Waistband Warrior. In Book 1, he made a special appearance, where he enters Deputy Dangerous's trap, designed as an underwear cleaner, and the Deputy zaps his powers, turning them into a juice.
Starbutts Giraffe - A three-eyed giraffe who works at Starbutts.
The Doctor - During the time of Billy's birth, he attempts to give him the "spank of life", only to send him flying out the window. Upon returning to the birthing room, Billy, with his super powers, pays back the doctor by spanking.

Foreword characters
George Beard - The author of this comic book.
Harold Hutchins - The illustrator of this comic book.
Mr. Krupp - The principal of Jerome Horwitz Elementary School, who finds both books in the Super Diaper Baby series offensive.

Sequel

On the last page of the first book, an advertisement for a sequel titled Super Diaper Baby 2: Invasion of the Potty Snatchers can be found. However, the sequel took longer than the anticipated release due to Dav Pilkey taking care of his terminally ill father, who died in 2008. On the back page there was a picture of the book with the words The Third Epic Novel by George Beard and Harold Hutchins underneath. The long-awaited book was finally published on June 28, 2011, named The Third Graphic Novel.

Plot summary

Introduction
After Mr. Krupp reads the "Super Diaper Baby" comic, he is furious and yells at the boys for creating such a rude and offensive comic, suggesting that they try and write about something more appropriate. He gives them the book How the Grinch Stole Christmas! as an example and states that it was his favorite book during his childhood (with the last seven pages torn out). The book inspires the boys and they decide to make a sequel, about pee, which only angers Mr. Krupp even more.

Main plot
The Hoskins and Diaper Dog set up a picnic in the park where Billy ends up over a tree, but then he and Diaper Dog force a doll back from a bully, get a ball out of a portable toilet and get a toe-broken kid to the hospital in a few seconds. That night, Mr. Hoskins feels depressed, but after a reminder by his wife, he decides to read "Mechafrog and Robotoad are Enemies" to Billy, but he can now read it to him, instead, due to the powers he gained. Meanwhile, two criminals called Dr. Dilbert Dinkle and Petey the Cat sneak into Jim's Bank, but before Dr. Dinkle can measure for his invention, careless Petey accidentally pushes the lever and Dr. Dinkle turns into water, then Petey accidentally destroys the invention, meaning that Dr. Dinkle is made out of water permanently, but Dr. Dinkle thinks that he actually likes being made out of water when he is able to turn into a puddle and sneak into the vault to get the money. Back at his home, Dr. Dinkle finds out he will never pay the water bill, but his supply is cut off after two weeks. Petey complains he needs water for drinking, but Dr. Dinkle goes to sleep and Petey drinks him in revenge. The next morning, Dr. Dinkle yells in surprise to be let out, right when Petey needs to urinate and the cat leaps into his litter box. Dr. Dinkle discovers that he is now made out of urine as Petey coins the name "Rip Van Tinkle", much to his dismay, and makes jokes at his expense, making him go to multiple places, all of which kick him out for smelling horrible.

The following night, Rip Van Tinkle puts Petey in the Robo Kitty 3000, before he evaporates and rains pee on people. Soon the pee drops break into houses to steal toilets for the Robo Kitty 3000 to destroy. One drop gets caught by Billy, so it tricks him into thinking that it will repair the toilet, gives him a juice box in bed, then the Kitty destroys the toilet. The next day, Mr. and Mrs. Hoskins are in pain, but put on diapers, while the mayor decides to drain the pool. The pee drops unite to create Rip Van Tinkle, while Petey steals diapers to sell to the people who were robbed of toilets, but Rip Van Tinkle takes Petey's money and the cat soaks him up with toilet paper. Super Diaper Baby and Diaper Dog arrive, only for Petey to evolve the Robo Kitty 3000 into the Supa-Mecha Kitty 3000. Super Diaper Baby flies to buy catnip and pour it inside the control seat. Petey goes crazy after having the slightest sniff of the catnip, bounces around, and detaches the Supa - Mecha Kitty 3000's head. Super Diaper Baby and Diaper Dog grab Petey and carry him off to jail.

A drop of pee gets flicked up and lands in the Mayor's pool, where it grows into an enlarged Rip Van Tinkle, whom the duo finds wreaking havoc at the train tracks. Rip Van Tinkle uses the train as nunchucks and hits both of them. Rip Van Tinkle overpowers the two, and smashes a building right on top of them. However, Super Diaper Baby remembers that a week before, he put his juice box in the freezer and it froze solid, giving Diaper Dog the idea to push down on the Earth. It works, making the Earth go farther and farther from the Sun. Rip Van Tinkle freezes and Diaper Dog and Super Diaper Baby carry Rip Van Tinkle while Super Diaper Baby gets an idea of how to cheer up his father.

Back at the Hoskins' house, Billy tells Mr. Hoskins that there was an ice monster outside (Rip Van Tinkle) and tells his dad he's brave enough to stand up to him. Diaper Dog, hiding behind and making a voice for Rip Van Tinkle, talks to Mr. Hoskins. The "ice monster" is "scared" of Mr. Hoskins' talking and leaves Earth. While someone asks for Mr. Hoskins' autograph, Super Diaper Baby and Diaper Dog take Rip Van Tinkle to Uranus, only for Deputy Doo Doo to say The Baby again.. They come back, and take a picture with Mr. and Mrs. Hoskins with a news reporter and put on a newspaper saying "Diaper Clad Dad Saves The Earth!".

Controversy
Super Diaper Baby has frequently been banned and challenged, landing the 47th spot on the American Library Association's "Top 100 Banned/Challenged Books" between 2000 and 2009, as the 41st spot of the "Top 100 Most Banned and Challenged Books: 2010-2019."

Super Diaper Baby was challenged in the Riverside Unified School District for being inappropriate for children with its excessive toilet humor, and also faced criticism for its intentionally misspelled words, but a committee voted 5–2 to reject its removal.

The book was removed at the Channelview Independent School District after an elementary student was suspended for a day after calling another student a "poo poo head".

References

External links
Super Diaper Baby on Dav Pilkey's website.
Super Diaper Baby 2: Invasion of the Potty Snatchers on Dav Pilkey's website.

2002 American novels
Captain Underpants novels
Novels set in Ohio
Censored books
Blue Sky Press books